Eucalyptus largiflorens, or black box or river box, is a tree that is endemic to Australia. It has rough, fibrous or flaky bark, dull greenish-grey, lance-shaped leaves, oval to club-shaped green to yellow flower buds, white flowers and hemispherical, cup-shaped or barrel-shaped fruit.

Description
The bark is dark grey and fibrous or flaky, sometimes furrowed on the trunk. The operculum is hemispherical to cone-shaped, shorter and narrower than the flower cup. The stamens are white. Flowering occurs in most months but especially in autumn and spring.

Taxonomy
Eucalyptus largiflorens was first formally described in 1855 by Ferdinand von Mueller and the description was published in Transactions and Prodeedings of the Victorian Institute for the Advancement of Science. The specific epithet (largiflorens) is derived from the Latin words largus meaning "abundant" and florens meaning "blooming", referring to the size of the inflorescence.

Distribution
The black box is widespread in Queensland, New South Wales, Victoria and South Australia, especially in grassy woodland on the floodplains of the Murray–Darling basin, but usually in dryer sites than river red gum (E. camaldulensis).

Use by Indigenous Australians
The small seeds of the black box were eaten raw by Indigenous Australians when grass seeds were scarce. Fruiting branches were cut down and placed in the sun to induce the capsules to open. Once the seeds were extracted, they were soaked and treated with several changes of water to remove the bitterness. They were then dried, ground on a grinding stone, and eaten raw.

See also

List of Eucalyptus species

References

Flora of New South Wales
Flora of Queensland
Flora of South Australia
Flora of Victoria (Australia)
Trees of Australia
largiflorens
Myrtales of Australia
Taxa named by Ferdinand von Mueller
Plants described in 1848